Ben Reynolds may refer to:

 Ben Reynolds (Australian rugby league), Australian rugby league player
 Ben Reynolds (rugby league, born 1994), English rugby league player 
 Ben Reynolds (athlete) (born 1990), Irish athlete

See also
 Benjamin Reynolds (1927–1976), member of the Pennsylvania House of Representatives